Macrocyclidae is a family of air-breathing land snails, terrestrial pulmonate gastropod mollusks in the superfamily Acavoidea (according to the taxonomy of the Gastropoda by Bouchet & Rocroi, 2005).

Genera 
The family Macrocyclidae has no subfamilies.

Genera within the family Macrocyclidae include:
 Macrocyclis, the type genus

References